USD is an abbreviation for the United States dollar, the official currency of the United States.

USD may also refer to:
 Ultrasonic Silent Drive, Tamron lens designation
 Under Secretary of Defense, United States
 Unified school district
  (USD), the French name of the Special Handling Unit (SHU) at the Regional Reception Centre, a Canadian prison
 Sanata Dharma University (Universitas Sanata Dharma), Indonesia
 University of San Diego, San Diego, California, United States
 University of South Dakota, Vermillion, South Dakota, United States
 Universal Scene Description, an open-source graphics framework by Pixar, and associated  file format
 The Upside Down, Houdini's term for the Chinese Water Torture Cell
 Upside-down motorcycle fork